Signepupina pfeifferi is a species of land snail with an operculum, a terrestrial gastropod mollusk in the family Pupinidae. 

This species is the endemic to Queensland, Australia.

References 

 Stanisic, J.; Shea, M.; Potter, D.; Griffiths, O. (2010). Australian land snails. Volume 1. A field guide to eastern Australian species. Queensland Museum, Brisbane. 596 pp.

External links
 Dohrn, H. 1862. Description of new operculated land shells. Proceedings of the Zoological Society of London 1862: 181-184
 OBIS info

Gastropods of Australia
Signepupina
Gastropods described in 1862